The Novartis Prizes for Immunology were established in 1990 by Sandoz to honour outstanding research in immunology, and expanded to their current form in 1992. Prizes for basic and clinical immunology are awarded every 3 years. A special prize was awarded in 2004.

Sandoz Prize for Immunology
 1990 Max Cooper, Jacques Miller

Novartis Prize for Basic Immunology
 2016 John Kappler, Philippa Marrack, Harald von Boehmer
 2013 , 
 2010 
 2007 Fred Alt, Klaus Rajewsky, 
 2004 Ralph Steinman
 2001 Klas Kärre, 
 1998 Tak Mak
 1995 Melvin Cohn, Avrion Mitchison, David Talmage
 1992 Jack Strominger

Novartis Prize for Clinical Immunology
 2016 Zelig Eshhar, Carl June, Steven Rosenberg
 2013 James Allison
 2010 Charles Dinarello, Jürg Tschopp
 2007 , Doug Lowy, Ian Frazer
 2004 Hugh McDevitt
 2001 Alain Fischer
 1998 Barry Bloom, George Bellamy Mackaness, Andrew McMichael
 1995 Robert Schwartz, Thierry Boon
 1992 Tadamitsu Kishimoto, Toshio Hirano

Special Novartis Prize for Immunology
 2004 Leonard Herzenberg

See also

 List of medicine awards

Source

References

Medicine awards
Novartis